Jay Hoyland Arnette (born December 19, 1938) is an American former professional basketball player. He played college basketball for the Texas Longhorns. Arnette played professionally for the Cincinnati Royals of the NBA from 1963–1965.

A 6'2" guard born in Austin, Texas and from Austin's University of Texas, Arnette competed at the 1960 Summer Olympics, where he won a gold medal with the United States men's national basketball team. From 1963 to 1965, he played in the National Basketball Association as a member of the Cincinnati Royals, averaging 3.7 points per game. In 2010, the 1960 United States men's Olympic basketball team on which Arnette played was collectively inducted into the Naismith Memorial Basketball Hall of Fame.

While playing basketball Arnette attended a dental school at Baylor College of Dentistry. He later obtained licenses in dentistry and pharmacy, but practiced orthodontics in Austin, Texas.

References

External links
 
 Olympians' Almanza and Arnette look back at a century of Horns hoops at TexasSports.com

1938 births
Living people
American dentists
Basketball players at the 1960 Summer Olympics
Basketball players from Austin, Texas
Cincinnati Royals draft picks
Cincinnati Royals players
Medalists at the 1960 Summer Olympics
Olympic gold medalists for the United States in basketball
Texas Longhorns men's basketball players
United States men's national basketball team players
American men's basketball players
Point guards